Flight 193 may refer to:

National Airlines Flight 193, crashed on 8 May 1978
Tara Air Flight 193, crashed on 24 February 2016

0193